Lemawork Ketema (born 22 October 1985) is an Austrian long-distance runner. In 2019, he competed in the men's marathon at the 2019 World Athletics Championships held in Doha, Qatar. He finished in 41st place.

Career 

He competed in the men's half marathon event at the 2016 European Athletics Championships held in Amsterdam, Netherlands. He finished in 20th place.

In 2018, he competed in the men's half marathon at the 2018 IAAF World Half Marathon Championships held in Valencia, Spain. He finished in 67th place. In the same year, he also competed in the men's marathon at the 2018 European Athletics Championships held in Berlin, Germany. He finished in 8th place with a personal best of 2:13:22. He won the bronze medal in the 2018 European Marathon Cup.

He competed in the men's marathon at the 2020 Summer Olympics held in Tokyo, Japan. He did not finish his race.

Competition record

References

External links 
 

Living people
1985 births
Austrian people of Ethiopian descent
Austrian male long-distance runners
Austrian male marathon runners
World Athletics Championships athletes for Austria
Place of birth missing (living people)
Olympic male marathon runners
Athletes (track and field) at the 2020 Summer Olympics
Olympic athletes of Austria